Luis García Conde (born 23 April 1979) is a Spanish retired footballer who played as a goalkeeper.

Club career
Born in Toledo, Castile-La Mancha, García grew through the ranks of Atlético Madrid, but never made it past the reserve side. He went on to make his debut as a professional in the second division with Xerez CD and CD Numancia, achieving promotion with the latter.

For the 2004–05 season, García moved to La Liga with Real Zaragoza after having been signed as a replacement for César Láinez, who had been forced to retire from football at just 27. He played in all but one league game and conceded 53 goals, also appearing in ten UEFA Cup matches as the Aragonese exited in the round-of-16.

From 2005 to 2007, García represented Madrid outskirts club Getafe CF: after being first-choice throughout his first year he backed up Argentine Roberto Abbondanzieri in his second, being restricted to Copa del Rey contests as the team went all the way to finish runner-up to Sevilla FC.

García was not registered for the first part of the 2007–08 campaign and, in January 2008, he was loaned to RC Celta de Vigo where he would not make one single appearance. For 2008–09 he stayed in the second level, joining – yet on loan – CD Tenerife, with the move being made permanent the following summer.

After only four appearances in two seasons combined for the Canary Islands side, with two consecutive relegations, 32-year-old García signed in early November 2011 for SD Huesca in division two. He made his debut on the 12th, in a 2–2 home draw against Real Valladolid.

References

External links

1979 births
Living people
Sportspeople from Toledo, Spain
Spanish footballers
Footballers from Castilla–La Mancha
Association football goalkeepers
La Liga players
Segunda División players
Segunda División B players
Tercera División players
Atlético Madrid B players
Xerez CD footballers
CD Numancia players
Real Zaragoza players
Getafe CF footballers
RC Celta de Vigo players
CD Tenerife players
SD Huesca footballers
CF Rayo Majadahonda players